Low Fell railway station served the Low Fell area of Gateshead between 1868 and 1952.

History
The station was opened by the North Eastern Railway (NER) on 1 December 1868. It was situated on the NER's Team Valley line, which opened for passenger trains the same day – it had been open since 2 March 1868 for freight traffic only.

The station was closed by British Railways on 7 April 1952, but the line remains open as part of the East Coast Main Line.

References

External links
 Information from Gateshead council
Low Fell Station on navigable O.S. map

Disused railway stations in Tyne and Wear
Former North Eastern Railway (UK) stations
Railway stations in Great Britain opened in 1868
Railway stations in Great Britain closed in 1952